Women's field hockey at the 2006 Asian Games was held in Al-Rayyan Hockey Field, Doha from December 2 to December 13, 2006.

Squads

Results
All times are Arabia Standard Time (UTC+03:00)

Preliminary round

Pool matches

Classification round

Fifth and sixth place

Bronze-medal match

Gold-medal match

Statistics

Final standings

Goalscorers

References

Results

External links
Official website

2006
Women
2006 in women's field hockey
Field hockey at the 2008 Summer Olympics – Women's qualification
2006